

The Azcárate O-E-1 was a reconnaissance-bomber aircraft developed in Mexico in the late 1920s. It was designed by General Brigadier Juan Francisco Azcárate and built at the TNCA workshops near Mexico City. A trainer version, the Azcárate E-1 (for Escuela) was also built. It was a sesquiplane of conventional configuration with tailskid undercarriage, and seating the crew in tandem, open cockpits. The types are sometimes collectively referred to simply as the "Azcárate sesquiplane" (sesquiplano in Spanish).

On 30 September 1928, pilot Gustavo León and Subteniente and mechanic Ricardo González set out on an aerial circumnavigation of Mexico in an O-E-1. Conducted in 58 legs, they completed their  flight on 18 December.

Specifications (E-1)

References

See also

O-E-1
1920s Mexican bomber aircraft
Single-engined tractor aircraft
Sesquiplanes